The Exmoor Singers of London Chamber Choir was a choir with a strong focus on music by living composers and in particular British composers.

In 2007, the choir collaborated with rock group Bloc Party to perform at the BBC Electric Proms, which was broadcast on both BBC2 television and BBC Radio 1. The choir subsequently recorded tracks for Bloc Party album Intimacy, released in 2008.  The choir also recorded with rock group Snow Patrol and feature on the album A Hundred Million Suns.  Members of the choir subsequently performed with the band on BBC1 television on Later... with Jools Holland. Most recently members of the choir recorded with folk rock group Noah and the Whale.

As hosts of the London Tallis Festival, the choir was broadcast on BBC Radio 3 on 28 October 2007. The choir also appears regularly on BBC1 television on Songs of Praise.

Exmoor Singers actively promote music by living composers, in dedicated concerts; by more generally programming new works; and specifically in commissioning new works. For the choir's first concert dedicated entirely to living composers, on 29 May 2002, the group received a four-star review from The Times.

The choir has given a number of first performances, but more particularly aims to give second performances of works that might not otherwise be heard again.

New commissioned music
The choir has commissioned eight new choral works:   
Sounds: Three Kandinsky Poems (1999) – David Sawer
This Sceptr'd Isle (2005) – Paul Ayres
Dreaming England (This Sceptr'd Isle) (2005) – Peter McGarr
Tentatio (2006) – Jaakko Mäntyjärvi
Their Lonely Betters (based on a poem by W. H. Auden) (2007) – James Lavino
Love You Big as the Sky (a Lindisfarne Love Song) (2007) – Peter McGarr (broadcast in full on BBC Radio 3)
Three Auden Settings (based on poems by W. H. Auden) (2008) - James Lavino
Visitations (text adapted by James Lavino from the Book of Ezekiel) (2010) - James Lavino

The two works commissioned in 2005 entitled This Sceptr'd Isle may be the only settings for choir based on the speech in William Shakespeare's King Richard II, Act 2 scene 1.

Tentatio, Love You Big as the Sky and Visitations were commissioned for the Tallis Festival, and are 40-part unaccompanied works inspired by Thomas Tallis' Spem in alium.

References

London choirs